Hypercompe albicornis is a moth of the family Erebidae first described by Augustus Radcliffe Grote in 1865. It is found on Cuba.

Larvae have been recorded feeding on Helianthus, Luffa and Phaseolus species.

References

albicornis
Moths described in 1865
Endemic fauna of Cuba